Buckley Lake, elevation , is a lake in the Tahltan Highland of the Stikine Plateau of northern British Columbia, Canada. It is located east of Telegraph Creek at the north end of Mount Edziza Provincial Park.

References

External links

Lakes of British Columbia
Tahltan Highland